The Bundesliga, introduced in 1963, had a spectator average for its first season of over 27,000. The inaugural season was seen by over 6,6 million spectators with VfB Stuttgart being the best-supported team. After a slight increase in the second season figures declined to an all-time low by 1972–73, in the wake of the 1971 Bundesliga scandal, when the league averaged just over 17,400 spectators per game. In this season Rot-Weiß Oberhausen also set the all-time low for support, becoming the first team to record an average of less than 10,000 spectators when the club drew just 6,941 per game.

From 1973 onwards, until 1979, figures improved again for the Bundesliga, especially after clubs like Borussia Dortmund and VfB Stuttgart returned from the 2. Bundesliga. The latter became the first club to record an average above 50,000 when it drew 55,559 per home game in 1977–78. The league experienced another sharp decline in the 1980s, dropping to an average of just over 18,000 in 1985–86. It made a slow recovery from there and accelerated from 1991, after the German reunification in 1990. Since then the Bundesliga has experienced a steady increase, reaching its all-time high in 2011–12 when it attracted 13,805,514 spectators, twice as many as in its inaugural season, and recorded an average of 45,116.

Since 1998–99 season Borussia Dortmund has been the best-supported club each year, having surpassed the 80,000 mark per game in 2011–12. At the other end of the scale only on nine occasions have clubs attracted an average of less than 10,000, these being Rot-Weiß Oberhausen in 1972–73, Wuppertaler SV in 1974–75, Bayer Leverkusen in 1981–82, 1982–83, 1984–85 and 1987–88, FC Homburg in 1987–88 and 1989–90 and SpVgg Unterhaching in 1999–2000.

Stuttgart and Hannover, which are based in large cities, were relegated for the 2016–17 season, which caused a reduction in the average number of spectators. Both teams returned to the Bundesliga for the 2017–18 season, whereas Darmstadt and Ingolstadt, the two bottoms teams in attendance, were relegated.

Spectators
The spectator figures for league since the inaugural 1963–64 season. The 1963–64 and 1964–65 seasons were played with 16 clubs in the league, the 1991–92 with 20 clubs and all others with 18 clubs. The last eight matchdays of the 2019–20 season, the majority of the 2020–21 season and some matches at the start of the 2021–22 season were played behind closed doors due to the COVID-19 pandemic.

References

External links
Official Bundesliga website

Attendance

Football club attendances